Long Hải is a township (Thị trấn) and town in Long Điền District, Bà Rịa–Vũng Tàu province, in Vietnam.

References

Populated places in Bà Rịa-Vũng Tàu province
Communes of Bà Rịa-Vũng Tàu province
Townships in Vietnam